Ningye is a Plateau language of Nigeria.

Ningye is spoken by 3,000 to 4,000 people in Ningeshen Kurmi village, Kaduna State, Nigeria. The village is situated about 19 kilometers south of Fadan Karshi on the Akwanga road.

Ethnologue considers it as a dialect of Numana-Nunku-Gbantu-Numbu.

References

Sources
Blench, Roger. 2011. The Ningye language of Central Nigeria and its affinities.

Ninzic languages
Languages of Nigeria